The 2018 Båstad Challenger was a professional tennis tournament played on clay courts. It was the third edition of the tournament which was part of the 2018 ATP Challenger Tour. It took place in Båstad, Sweden between 9 and 14 July 2018.

Singles main-draw entrants

Seeds

 1 Rankings are as of 2 July 2018.

Other entrants
The following players received wildcards into the singles main draw:
  Filip Bergevi
  Markus Eriksson
  Jonathan Mridha
  Mikael Ymer

The following players received entry from the qualifying draw:
  Geoffrey Blancaneaux
  Filip Horanský
  Jules Okala
  Wu Di

The following player received entry as a lucky loser:
  Lukáš Klein

Champions

Singles

  Pedro Martínez def.  Corentin Moutet 7–6(7–5), 6–4.

Doubles

  Harri Heliövaara /  Henri Laaksonen def.  Zdeněk Kolář /  Gonçalo Oliveira 6–4, 6–3.

References

2018 ATP Challenger Tour
2018
Bast